Kapuwatta is one of the largest suburbs of Ja-Ela, Colombo, Sri Lanka. It has many institutes such as the Thiriposha Factory and Gampaha District's largest shopping mall  KZone Ja-Ela.

References

Ja-Ela